Declan Sebastian Eratt-Thompson (born 9 March 2002) is an English professional footballer who plays as a defender for Ilkeston Town.

Early and personal life
Thompson was diagnosed with Legg–Calvé–Perthes disease aged 5, and spent 18 months in a wheelchair. He is the son of former professional footballer Lee Thompson.

Career
Thompson played youth football with Sheffield Wednesday before being released at the age of 14. He began training with the Stocksbridge Park Steels first team, where his father was assistant manager, though could not play as he was too young. He registered with the league upon his sixteenth birthday in March 2018, and made his senior debut later that month as a late substitute against Kidsgrove Athletic on 28 March 2018.

He signed for Sheffield Wednesday on a two-year scholarship in summer 2018. Following his two-year scholarship, he signed a one-year-long professional contract in summer 2020. He made his senior debut on 9 January 2021 as a late substitute in a 2–0 FA Cup win over Exeter City. A one year option was activated in his contract on 12 May 2021, keeping him at the club until the summer of 2022. On 16 March 2022, manager Darren Moore announced he would be leaving the club upon the expiry of his contract.

On 19 August 2022, Thompson signed for Southern League Premier Division Central club Ilkeston Town. He made his debut the following day off the bench in a 1–1 draw with Redditch United.

Career statistics

References

External links
 
 SWFC Profile

2002 births
Living people
English footballers
Association football defenders
Stocksbridge Park Steels F.C. players
Sheffield Wednesday F.C. players
Ilkeston Town F.C. players
Northern Premier League players
Southern Football League players